Deguara is a surname. Notable people with the surname include:
Josiah Deguara (born 1997), American football tight end
Maria Deguara (born 1949), Maltese politician
Samuel Deguara (born 1991), Maltese-Italian basketball player

Italian-language surnames
Surnames of German origin
Maltese-language surnames